Haigh may refer to:

Places
Haigh, Greater Manchester, England - a village
Haigh, West Yorkshire, England - a village

Other uses
Haigh (surname)
Haigh's Chocolates, Australian chocolatier
Haigh Foundry, a locomotive manufacturer based in Wigan, England
Haigh Field, a public airport in the city of Orland, Glenn County, California, USA

See also
Haig (disambiguation)
Hague (disambiguation)
Haik (disambiguation)
Hayko (disambiguation)